The Caproni Ca.49 was a proposed Italian seaplane airliner of 1919.

Development
In 1919, the Caproni company designed the Ca.49, a passenger seaplane intended for use as an airliner. The proposed aircraft would have been a four-engine triplane, with three engines driving tractor propellers and one driving a pusher propeller. Although no specific engine selection was made, Caproni envisioned the four engines as being rated at between 224 and 279 kilowatts (300 and 375 horsepower) each. Passengers would have been carried in an enclosed cabin.

No examples of the Ca.49 were built.

Specifications (Ca.49 estimated)

See also

References

Ca.049
1910s Italian airliners
Triplanes
Flying boats
Four-engined push-pull aircraft